Khadem Anlu (also Romanized as Khādem Ānlū and Khadmanlū) is a village in Miankuh Rural District, Chapeshlu District, Dargaz County, Razavi Khorasan Province, Iran. At the 2006 census, its population was 562, in 154 families.

References 

Populated places in Dargaz County